"So Young" is a song by English rock band Suede, released as the fourth and final single from their self-titled debut album on 17 May 1993 through Nude Records. It charted at number 22 on the UK Singles Chart. "So Young" was a last-minute addition to the album. It was written just three months ahead of its release, in contrast to the bulk of the album, which had been demoed almost a year previously.

The video for the single was directed by David Lewis and Andy Crabb, who later went on to direct a series of backdrop films for Suede as well as the live tour film Introducing The Band and features children from the Kent coastal town of Whitstable. Originally intended to have no footage of the band members, a shoot was later arranged at the instigation of the record company who insisted that the band appear.

Track listings
All songs were written by Brett Anderson and Bernard Butler.

7-inch vinyl, cassette
 "So Young"
 "High Rising"

12-inch vinyl, CD
 "So Young"
 "Dolly"
 "High Rising"

References

1992 songs
1993 singles
Song recordings produced by Ed Buller
Songs written by Bernard Butler
Songs written by Brett Anderson
Suede (band) songs